A slide whistle  (variously known as a swanee or swannee whistle, lotos flute piston flute,  or jazz flute) is a wind instrument consisting of a fipple like a recorder's and a tube with a piston in it. Thus it has an air reed like some woodwinds, but varies the pitch with a slide. The construction is rather like a bicycle pump. Because the air column is cylindrical and open at one end and closed at the other, it overblows the third harmonic. "A whistle made out of a long tube with a slide at one end. An ascending and descending glissando is produced by moving the slide back and forth while blowing into the mouthpiece." "Tubular whistle with a plunger unit in its column, approximately 12 inches long. The pitch is changed by moving the slide plunger in and out, producing ascending and descending glisses."

History 
Piston flutes, in folk versions usually made of cane or bamboo, existed in Africa, Asia, and the Pacific as well as Europe before the modern version was invented in England in the nineteenth century. The latter, which may be more precisely referred to as the slide or Swanee whistle, is commonly made of plastic or metal.

The modern slide whistle is familiar as a sound effect (as in animated cartoon sound tracks, when a glissando can suggest something rapidly ascending or falling, or when a player hits a "Bankrupt" on Wheel of Fortune), but it is also possible to play melodies on a slide whistle.

The swanee whistle dates back at least to the 1840s, when it was manufactured by the Distin family and featured in their concerts in England. Early slide whistles were also made by the English J Stevens & Son and H A Ward. By the 1920s the slide whistle was common in the US, and was occasionally used in popular music and jazz as a special effect. For example, it was used on Paul Whiteman's early hit recording of "Whispering" (1920). Even Louis Armstrong switched over from his more usual cornet to the slide whistle for a chorus on a couple of recordings with King Oliver's Creole Jazz Band, such as Sobbin' Blues (1923). At that time, slide saxophones, with reeds rather than a fipple, were also built. The whistle was also widely used in Jug band music of the 1920s such as Whistler's Jug Band. Gavin Gordon uses a slide whistle in his ballet The Rake's Progress (1935).

Uses 

The slide whistle is often thought of as a toy instrument, especially in the West, though it has been and still is used in various forms of "serious" music. Its first appearance in notated European classical music may have been when Maurice Ravel called for one in his opera L'enfant et les sortilèges. More modern uses in classical music include Paul Hindemith's Kammermusik No. 1, op. 24 no. 1 (1922), Luciano Berio's Passaggio, which uses five, and the Violin Concerto of György Ligeti, as well as pieces by Cornelius Cardew, Alberto Ginastera, Hans Werner Henze, Peter Maxwell Davies, and Krzysztof Penderecki (De Natura Sonoris II, 1971). John Cage's Music of Changes (1951) and Water Music (1952) both feature slide whistle and duck calls. The slide whistle is also used in many of the works of P. D. Q. Bach.

In the 1930s through the 1950s it was played with great dexterity by Paul 'Hezzie' Trietsch, one of the founding members of the Hoosier Hot Shots. They made many recordings.

Roger Waters played two notes on the slide whistle in the song Flaming, from Pink Floyd's debut album The Piper at the Gates of Dawn.

A more recent appearance of the slide whistle can be heard in the 1979 song "Get Up" by Vernon Burch. The slide whistle segment of this song was later sampled by Deee-Lite in their 1990 hit "Groove Is in the Heart".
Fred Schneider of The B-52's plays a plastic toy slide whistle in live performances of the song "Party Out of Bounds" as a prop for the song's drunken partygoer theme, in place of the trumpet thus used in the studio for the Wild Planet song.

On the popular BBC Radio 4 comedy panel game show "I'm Sorry I Haven't A Clue" the swanee whistle has been paired for comic effect with the kazoo in a musical round called "Swanee-Kazoo" which has been played for over forty years.

See also
Square wave
Tin whistle
Whistle
Whistling

References

Continuous pitch instruments
Internal fipple flutes
Woodwind instruments
Toy instruments and noisemakers